John Isted (dates of birth and death unknown) was an English cricketer.  Isted's batting and bowling style is unknown.  It's not known where or when he was born, but it is known he was christened at Lindfield, Sussex on 9 December 1810.

Isted made two first-class appearances for Sussex, both against Nottinghamshire in 1853 at the Royal Brunswick Ground, Hove and Trent Bridge.  He also made a single first-class appearance for the Gentlemen of England in that season against the United All-England Eleven at the Royal Brunswick Ground.  He took a total of 5 wickets in his three first-class matches, which came at an approximate average of 16.25.  The average is approximate because of incomplete statistics on how many runs he conceded as a bowler, with him having conceded at least 65 runs.  His best bowling figures were 3/50.

References

External links
John Isted at ESPNcricinfo
John Isted at CricketArchive

People from Lindfield, West Sussex
English cricketers
Sussex cricketers
Gentlemen of England cricketers